Narvsky Municipal Okrug is a municipal okrug in Kirovsky District, one of the eighty-one low-level municipal divisions  of the federal city of St. Petersburg, Russia. As of the 2010 Census, its population was 30,810, up from 29,822 recorded during the 2002 Census.

It was formerly known as Municipal Okrug 29.

References

Notes

Sources

Kirovsky District, Saint Petersburg